Jamiat Ulema-e-Islam (abbreviated as JUI) was founded by Shabbir Ahmad Usmani as an offshoot of the Jamiat Ulema-e-Hind (JUH) on 26 October 1945.

History
The original Jamiat Ulema-e-Hind was formed in British India in 1919.
After the death of Shabbir Ahmad Usmani in 1949, his close associate Zafar Ahmad Usmani replaced him as head or Amir of JUH. Then Mufti Mahmud became Amir of this party in 1962 and remained its head until his death in 1980.

After the death of Mufti Mahmud, the group was further divided during Muhammad Zia-ul-Haq regime, namely Jamiat Ulema-e-Islam (S) supporting Jihadism and a totalitarian state whereas Jamiat Ulema-e-Islam (F) supporting the movement for restoration of democracy in Pakistan. In Pakistan, the JUI was active in the anti-Ahmadiyya riots in 1953 and 1974 and anti-Shia agitations. Part of the JUI’s agenda has also been to establish a "pure" Islam in Pakistan. In particular, the JUI has sought to eliminate the worship of saints and other practices they regard as un-Islamic.

Following were its breakaway factions:
Jamiat Ulema-e-Islam (F) – headed by Fazal-ur-Rehman
Jamiat Ulema-e-Islam (S) – headed by Hamid Ul Haq Haqqani
Jamiat Ulama-e-Islam Nazryati  – headed by Maulvi Asmatullah
Jamiat Ulema-e-Islam Bangladesh – headed by Zia Uddin
Jamiat Ulema-e-Islam Pakistan – headed by Muhammad Khan Sherani

Electoral History

See also 
 List of Deobandi organisations

References

 
1947 establishments in Pakistan
Political parties established in 1947
Islamic political parties in Pakistan
Far-right political parties in Pakistan
Deobandi organisations